Elery Hamilton-Smith  (28 December 1929 – 27 June 2015) was an Australian interdisciplinary scholar and academic, and later an adjunct professor of Environmental Studies at Charles Sturt University.

Background
Elery Hamilton-Smith was born on a property named Shady Grove, near Hahndorf and grew up in rural South Australia.

He did not have conventional academic training, and graduated from the University of Adelaide with a Diploma in Social Sciences in 1956.
 
His professional career moved between research, consultancy and teaching in 50 countries.
From 1949 to 1968 he worked in teaching and community services.
From 1969 to 1977 he was a social policy & planning consultant, with an honorary position as zoologist at the South Australia Museum.  His work included many studies on social policy and open space in Victoria, Australia. 
In the 1980s and 90s he was lecturer and then Professor, latterly in the Department of Leisure Studies, Phillip Institute of Technology (now RMIT University), Melbourne.
Professor, Department of Environmental Studies, Charles Sturt University
He spent a total of 15 years outside Australia working for the UNESCO World Heritage Bureau and the United Nations Development Program. Educational 
Fellowship with the Government of Canada.
He also had many years of working (as a volunteer) within various IUCN programs.

Professional contributions
Hamilton-Smith had wide interests. He worked on: 
 social policy development and programmes dealing with youth issues.
 development of leisure and outdoor recreation activities
 Conservation, particularly tourism and visitor appreciation of wilderness and National Parks
 Cave and karst management
 sustainability and environmental studies.

Awards
Membership of the Order of Australia (AM) in Australia Day Honours List in 2001
former federal president of the Australian Association of Social Workers

Bibliography
Elery Hamilton-Smith. 2013. Natural heritage and environmental citizenship. In Stewart Lockie and Heather Aslin (eds.) Engaged Environmental Citizenship. Charles Darwin University Press.  pp 136–149. 
 Elery Hamilton-Smith. 2010.  Click Go the Cameras at Jenolan Caves 1860-1940 Occasional Paper No. 6.  Jenolan Caves Historical & Preservation Society.
 Brian Finlayson & Elery Hamilton-Smith (eds.) 2003. Beneath the Surface: A Natural History of Australian Caves. University of New South Wales Press.
 Elery Hamilton-Smith (ed.) 1992. Park visitor research for better management Papers from a workshop convened by the Department of Leisure Studies, Phillip Institute of Technology in conjunction with Charles Sturt University and Melbourne Water, 24–26 June 1992.
Elery Hamilton-Smith, David Mercer. 1991. Urban Parks and Their Visitors. Melbourne and Metropolitan Board of Works.
David Mercer, Elery Hamilton-Smith. 1980.  Recreation Planning and Social Change in Australia. Sorrett Publishing.
Elery Hamilton-Smith, Colin John Balmer 1972. Broadmeadows - a Growing City. Youth Services Planning Division, Victorian Association of Youth Clubs. 586pp.

References

1929 births
2015 deaths
Academic staff of Charles Sturt University
University of Adelaide alumni
Academic staff of RMIT University
Members of the Order of Australia